Abderahmane Hachoud (born July 2, 1988, in El Attaf) is an Algerian professional football player.

Club career
Hachoud began his career as a forward in the junior ranks of MC Alger, and was promoted to the first team ahead of the 2006–07 season.

In 2009, Hachoud was chosen as the Best Young Player of the Algerian League by DZFoot.

ES Sétif
On June 2, 2010, Hachoud signed a two-year contract with ES Sétif, joining them on a free transfer. On July 16, 2010, he made his official debut for the club as a second-half substitute in a group stage game of the 2010 CAF Champions League against Tunisian side Espérance ST. He went on to play in all 6 of ES Sétif's games in the group stage, starting in 4 of them.

On July 13, 2012, Hachoud joined MC Alger on a free transfer, signing a two-year contract with the club.

Honours
 ES Sétif
 Algerian Cup: 2011–12
 Algerian Ligue Professionnelle 1: 2011–12

References

External links
 
 

1988 births
Living people
Algerian footballers
ES Sétif players
MC Alger players
CA Bordj Bou Arréridj players
Algerian Ligue Professionnelle 1 players
Algeria A' international footballers
2011 African Nations Championship players
People from El Attaf
Algeria international footballers
Association football defenders
21st-century Algerian people